Dedja is a surname of Albanian origin. Notable people with the surname include:

Bashkim Dedja (born 1970), Albanian jurist
Edlira Dedja, Albanian musician
Hysen Dedja (born 1960), Albanian footballer and manager
Rifat Dedja, Albanian politician

Surnames of Albanian origin